Kavminvodyavia (KMV Avia) was an airline based in Mineralnye Vody in the Caucasus, Russia. It operated scheduled services to over 20 destinations in the northern Caucasus region and abroad, as well as charter services. Its main base was Mineralnye Vody Airport, which was also operated by the company.

History
The first airport operation was in 1925, when a French Dornue-Comet was the sole aircraft. The present three-story airport building opened in 1965.

The airline was established in 1961 as the Mineralnye Vody Aviation Group. Its first international destination was Berlin in 1980. The airport and its civil aviation service was reorganized into the Mineralnye Vody Civil Aviation Enterprise in 1988, under the direction of V.V. Babaskin. It was reorganized again in 1995 into the State United Venture Kavminvodyavia, more commonly known as KMV. The airline purchased several Tupolev Tu-204 aircraft in 1997.

Following the 2010 decision of the Russian government to transfer the assets to Aeroflot, the airline ceased operations on 1 October 2011.

Destinations

In August 2010, Kavminvodyavia operated flights to the following:
All flights to the European Union were suspended on 19 June 2007 due to fleet issues.

Scheduled
 
 Yerevan – Zvartnots International Airport
 
 Irkutsk – Irkutsk International Airport
 Khabarovsk – Khabarovsk Novy Airport
 Moscow
 Domodedovo Airport
 Sheremetyevo Airport
 Vnukovo Airport (focus city)
 Mineralnye Vody – Mineralnye Vody Airport (hub)
 Nizhnevartovsk – Nizhnevartovsk Airport
 Novokuznetsk – Spichenkovo Airport
 Novosibirsk – Tolmachevo Airport
 Noyabrsk – Noyabrsk Airport
 Pevek – Pevek Airport
 Saint Petersburg – Pulkovo Airport
 Stavropol – Stavropol Shpakovskoye Airport
 Yekaterinburg – Koltsovo Airport
 
 Simferopol – Simferopol International Airport

Charter
 
 Burgas – Burgas Airport
 
 Paphos – Paphos International Airport
 
 Thessaloniki – Thessaloniki International Airport
 
 Tel Aviv – Ben Gurion International Airport
 
 Turin – Sandro Pertini International Airport (Caselle)

Fleet
In April 2011 the Kavminvodyavia fleet included:

112 first class (3 rows, 4 abreast) and 18 (3 rows, 6 abreast) seats.

References

External links

Kavminvodyavia 
Kavminvodyavia 
Kavminvodyavia Fleet

Defunct airlines of Russia
Airlines established in 1995
Airlines disestablished in 2011
Former Aeroflot divisions
Federal State Unitary Enterprises of Russia
Companies based in Stavropol Krai